Music from Salem is a chamber music festival in Washington County, New York. Founded in 1985 by violist Lila Brown and violinist Judith Eissenberg. The festival features a summer concert series at the historic Hubbard Hal in Cambridge, New York; free children's workshops at area libraries and open rehearsals at the Brown Farm in Salem, New York – birthplace of Music from Salem. In 2006, the cellist Rhonda Rider and the pianist Judith Gordon joined Music from Salem as artistic co-directors.

The festival fuses familiar classics with lesser known works and the repertoire often includes contemporary works by composers such as Lee Hyla, John Harbison, John Cage and John Adams. The Cambridge Commission, a community supported bi-annual award launched in 2002, has brought the works of Allen Shawn, Gernot Wolfgang, Karl Korte and Gerald Busby to Music from Salem audiences.

Festival performers have included Diane Walsh, Ida Levin, Robert Levin, Sanford Sylvan, David Krakauer, Gilad Harel, Peter Matzka, Mary Nessinger, Nina Tichman, Werner Dickel, Kari Ravnan, David Breitman, Ulrike-Anima Mathe, Kjell-Arne Jorgensen, Dongsok Shin and Delores Stevens.

Music from Salem is performed throughout Washington County at venues such as Pompanuck Farm Institute, Dionondehowa Wildlife Sanctuary and School and Salem Art Works. Off–season programming includes winter and spring concerts and, in early June, the acclaimed Cello Seminar for young professional musicians.

References
"Best of the Capital Region 2007", Metroland, 22 October 2008
Freedman, Geraldine, "Music from Salem season opener offers varying moods of Busby",  Daily Gazette, 20 October 2008 
Frisch, Tracy, "Summer Gems of Washington County: Intimate Gatherings where Artists reveal their Creative Process", Main Street [Cambridge], 8 August 2007, p. 9
"Lila Brown Interview", ThinkQuest Library, 20 October 2008 
"LARAC Organization of the Month 2002", LARAC, 22 October 2008 
Waller, John, "The Emotion is in the Music at Hubbard Hall", Bennington Banner'', 7 August 2008

External links
Music from Salem website
Music from Salem artists Nina Tichman and David Breitman on NPR

Music festivals in New York (state)
Classical music festivals in the United States